Camilla Vera Feslier Belich is a New Zealand lawyer and politician who became a Member of Parliament, representing the New Zealand Labour Party, in 2020.

Biography

Early life and career
As a law student Belich became involved in student politics and was co-president of the New Zealand University Students Association. In 2000 she was a member of the New Zealand Youth Parliament, selected to represent Rongotai MP Annette King. Belich has worked as an employment lawyer, beginning her career at Oakley Moran, a Wellington law firm, before moving to London in 2009 where she worked for a law firm and later for Unison, the largest trade union in the United Kingdom between 2012 and 2016. There, she won acclaim for her role in winning a high-profile case in the Court of Justice of the European Union about safe working hours. She became an expert on employment discrimination cases and in January 2017 she joined the Wellington employment law firm Bartlett Law as a Senior Associate. She also worked for unions in New Zealand as a barrister and solicitor, firstly on equal pay issues at the New Zealand Council of Trade Unions from 2016 to 2019, and subsequently for the Public Service Association in Auckland.

Member of Parliament

In parliament she became the chair of the education and workforce select committee and in 2023 became the junior government whip. She missed out with fellow list MP Helen White winning the selection.

Personal life
Belich is the granddaughter of former Wellington mayor Sir James Belich and the niece of historian James Belich. She is married to former Labour Party secretary Andrew Kirton and has three children.

References

External links
 

Living people
New Zealand Labour Party MPs
Members of the New Zealand House of Representatives
New Zealand list MPs
21st-century New Zealand politicians
21st-century New Zealand women politicians
Women members of the New Zealand House of Representatives
Year of birth missing (living people)
New Zealand Youth MPs